Meritastis lythrodana is a species of moth of the family Tortricidae. It is found in Australia, including Tasmania.
Its larvae have been found among leaf litter of Eucalyptus spp., from which it is suspected to feed. Adults have a wingspan of an approximate 2 cm.

References

Moths of Australia
Epitymbiini
Moths described in 1881